Them is a small town in central Denmark with a population of 2,376 (1 January 2022), located in Silkeborg Municipality (formerly Them Municipality) in Jutland, lying a few kilometers south-west of Silkeborg, and north-east of Bryrup.

Business
The town is home to the Danish headquarters of Adidas.

Them is known for the dairy "Them Andelsmejeri" established in 1888.

Trike manufacturer Winther is also based here, and is still a family company.

References

Cities and towns in the Central Denmark Region
Silkeborg Municipality